Liu Jun (born 1972) is a Chinese banker and politician, currently serving as governor of the Bank of Communications and chief supervisor of the China National Association of Financial Market Institutional Investors.

He is an alternate member of the 20th Central Committee of the Chinese Communist Party.

Biography 
Liu was born in Tongwei County, Gansu, in 1972. He graduated from the Northeastern State University with a MBA in 1996 before gaining his DBA from Hong Kong Polytechnic University in 2003.

Starting in July 1993, he served in several posts in the China Everbright Bank, including trader, deputy head and than head of the Agency Branch of International Business Department, chief representative of Hong Kong Representative Office, general manager of Capital Department, general manager of Investment Banking Department, general manager of Financial Market Center, assistant governor, vice governor, and governor of Shanghai Branch. He was deputy general manager of China Everbright (Group) Corporation in July 2014 and subsequently deputy general manager of China Investment Corporation in October 2016. He was deputy party secretary of the Bank of Communications in May 2020, in addition to serving as governor two months later. He also serves as chief supervisor of the China National Association of Financial Market Institutional Investors since December 2021.

References 

1972 births
Living people
People from Tongwei County
Northeastern State University alumni
Alumni of the Hong Kong Polytechnic University
Chinese bankers
People's Republic of China politicians from Gansu
Chinese Communist Party politicians from Gansu
Alternate members of the 20th Central Committee of the Chinese Communist Party